Hyponephele cheena is a butterfly species belonging to the family Nymphalidae. It is found in India.

Subspecies
Hyponephele cheena cheena (Moore, 1865)
Hyponephele cheena iskander (Hemming, 1941)
Hyponephele cheena kashmirica (Moore, 1893–96)

References

External links
Hyponephele cheena at BOLD Systems - with images

Hyponephele
Butterflies described in 1865
Butterflies of Asia
Taxa named by Frederic Moore